Kolorcity Aréna is a sports stadium in Kazincbarcika, Hungary. The stadium is home to the famous association football side Kazincbarcikai SC. The stadium has a capacity of 1,020.

Attendance

Records
Record Attendance:
 15,000 Kazincbarcika v Budapest Honvéd, June 1990.

Gallery

External links 
Magyarfutball.hu 
 

Football venues in Hungary